The Austroalpine nappes are a geological nappe stack in the European Alps. The Alps contain three such stacks, of which the Austroalpine nappes are structurally on top of the other two (meaning they were thrust over the other two). The name Austroalpine means Southern Alpine, because these nappes crop out mainly in the Eastern Alps (the Alps east of the line Lake Constance - Chur – Lake Como).

Because the Austroalpine nappes consist of material from the former Apulian or Adriatic plate, that was thrust over the European plate, they are called allochthon nappes. In comparison with the other nappe stacks, they have experienced lower-grade metamorphism, which distinguishes them clearly from the Penninic nappes on which they rest.

Lithologies
The Austroalpine nappes are fragments of the former continental shelf and continental slope of the Apulian or Adriatic plate. These fragments contain rocks from the continental basement as well as from sedimentary rocks deposited in these environments.

The basement rocks have experienced metamorphism related to their original depth in the Earth's crust, but in the Austroalpine nappes Alpine metamorphism (i.e. metamorphism related to the formation of the Alps) is fairly low grade to non-existent. The basement rocks can be greenschist facies to amphibolite facies, depending on their original depth. They are Paleozoic schists and (para-)gneisses intruded by granites of Variscan and Tertiary age.

On top of this basement rock, Permian and Mesozoic sedimentary and volcanic rocks were deposited. Shallow marine limestones are abundant, these limestones now form the mountain chains of the northern part of the Eastern Alps, which are therefore together called the Northern Calcareous Alps. Sometimes, the limestone has been turned into dolomite, as in the Austrian region Salzkammergut and the German region Allgäu.

A special unit is the greywacke zone, a band of Paleozoic metamorphosed sedimentary rocks that forms an east-west band through the Austrian Alps. The greywacke zone crops out between the Mesozoic rocks of the Northern Calcareous Alps and the Austroalpine and Penninic basement rocks of the Central Eastern Alps.

All of these lithologies were folded and thrust, so that the basement rock can be found on top of the sediments and vice versa.

Geographic position
In Switzerland, the Austroalpine nappes have been eroded away except for a few isolated outcrops called the Sesia unit and the Dent Blanche klippe (the Matterhorn is the most outstanding example of an Austroalpine klippe). These remaining Swiss nappes have a different tectonic and metamorphic history than their counterparts in Austria, which is why they are not always considered a part of the Austroalpine nappes.

On the other hand, in Austria, the Austroalpine nappes cover the largest part of that country, except for a few windows like the Hohe Tauern window and the Engadin window.

Traces of the Eo-Alpine orogenic phase
Before the formation of the Alps in the lower and middle Tertiary period, the Austroalpine rocks experienced another deformation phase: the Eo-Alpine phase of mountain building that took place in the Cretaceous. The metamorphic grade increases to the east-south-east, so in a west-north-western direction, the traces become less severe. In the west of Switzerland, the event cannot be recognized. In Austria, however, Eo-Alpine eclogite lenses occur close to the Hohe Tauern window.

The Eo-Alpine phase is sometimes seen as the earliest phase of the Alpine orogeny. However, after the initial mountain-building, the tectonic plates moved away from each other. The next phase was more than 50 Ma later, so the events are often seen as unrelated.

References
Description of the geology of Austria, website of Christof Kuhn
Description of the geology of the Western and Central Alps, website of S.M. Schmid

Geology of the Alps
Structural geology
Geology of Austria
Geology of Switzerland
Geology of Italy